MT Pegasi is a single, yellow-hued star in the northern constellation of Pegasus. It has the designation HD 217813 in the Henry Draper Catalogue; MT Pegasi is the variable star designation. With an apparent visual magnitude of 6.616, it is a dim star that is at or below the nominal limit for visibility with the naked eye. This star is a member of the Ursa Major Moving Group, a collection of stars that originated in the same open cluster and now share a common motion through space.

This is a G-type main-sequence star with a stellar classification of G1 V. Harlan and Taylor (1970) had assigned it a class of G5 V, but this gives a poor match to the color index. HD 217813 was found to be variable in 1995 and hence it was given the variable star designation MT Pegasi (MT Peg). It displays brightness variations with a period of several days, which is caused by star spots that are modulated by the star's rotation period. MT Peg is classified as a BY Draconis variable.

MT Peg is considered a young solar analog, which means it is a solar-type star representative of how a young, more active Sun may have appeared when it was less than 1.5 billion years old. The estimated age based upon the chromospheric activity level is 397 million years, per Gray et al. (2015). Marsden et al. (2014) gave a larger age estimate of 1.2 billion years, but with a margin of error that overlaps the younger value. Age estimates of the Ursa Major group are around 300 million years old.

The star has 1.07 times the mass of the Sun and 1.01 times the Sun's radius. It is spinning with a projected rotational velocity of 3.2 km/s, giving it a rotation period of 5.8 days. The elemental composition of the stellar atmosphere is similar to the Sun. MT Peg is radiating 1.07 times the Sun's luminosity from its photosphere at an effective temperature of 5,885 K.

References

G-type main-sequence stars
BY Draconis variables
Solar analogs
Pegasus (constellation)
BD+20 5264
217813
113829
Pegasi, MT